The Europe/Africa Zone was one of the three zones of the regional Davis Cup competition in 1990.

In the Europe/Africa Zone there were two different tiers, called groups, in which teams competed against each other to advance to the upper tier. The winner in the Africa Zone Group II advanced to the Europe/Africa Zone Group I in 1991.

Participating nations

Draw

  promoted to Group I in 1991.

First round

Algeria vs. Egypt

Ivory Coast vs. Kenya

Second round

Togo vs. Senegal

Egypt vs. Morocco

Ivory Coast vs. Cameroon

Zambia vs. Zimbabwe

Third round

Morocco vs. Togo

Zimbabwe vs. Ivory Coast

Fourth round

Morocco vs. Zimbabwe

References

External links
Davis Cup official website

Davis Cup Europe/Africa Zone
Africa Zone Group II